"Don't Matter"  is a song by American rock band Kings of Leon. The song was released as a digital download on June 16, 2014, through RCA Records as the fifth single from their sixth studio album Mechanical Bull (2013). The song was written by Caleb Followill, Nathan Followill, Jared Followill and Matthew Followill.

Track listing

Chart performance

Weekly charts

References

2013 songs
2014 singles
Kings of Leon songs
RCA Records singles
Songs written by Caleb Followill
Songs written by Jared Followill
Songs written by Matthew Followill
Songs written by Nathan Followill